The U15 Group of Canadian Research Universities (commonly shortened to U15) is an association of 15 Canadian public research universities. It is headquartered in Ottawa and was established in 1991 to represent its members' interests, primarily to provincial and federal governments, concerning the research enterprise and government programs supporting research and development.

Its member institutions undertake 80 percent of all competitive university research in Canada, and represent a research enterprise valued at more than $5 billion annually. Together, they contribute upwards of C$36 billion to the Canadian economy every year, and produce more than 70 percent of all doctorates awarded in Canada.

History
The core of the U15 began when executive heads of five universities in Ontario—McMaster University, Queen's University, University of Toronto, University of Waterloo and the University of Western Ontario—began to meet informally to consider mutual interests. This group of five Ontario-based universities formed an association in the mid-1980s to advance the interests of their research-intensive institutions. By 1989, vice-presidents from other Canadian universities had joined the initial group. After a meeting at the University of British Columbia, they agreed to meet twice annually to share common concerns. In 1991, the universities formed a Group of Ten, made up of the original five Ontario universities, along with McGill University, University of Alberta, University of British Columbia, Université de Montréal, and Université Laval.

The group has since expanded twice, once in 2006, and again in 2011. In 2006, the group expanded to include Dalhousie University, University of Calgary, and the University of Ottawa, becoming the Group of Thirteen. In 2011, the group grew to its current size and membership with the addition of the University of Manitoba and the University of Saskatchewan. The group was reorganized and renamed as the U15. In 2012, the executive heads created a U15 Directorate and appointed the organization's first executive director.

Organization
The executive heads of the member universities govern the U15, supported by their respective chief academic officers and vice-presidents of research. The executive organ of the group is the executive committee, made up of the Chair and two Vice-Chairs. Through a process of peer nomination, the U15 appoints a Chair to lead the governing body. The committee is charged with acting on behalf of the U15 concerning operational matters related to the Secretariat. The current Chair is Feridun Hamdullahpur, who also serves as the president of the University of Waterloo.

In addition, the U15's executive committee operates a number of sub-committees that assist the administration in its operations. The Academic Affairs Committee advances collaborative initiatives and attempts to maximize cooperation among the member institutions. The Research Committee attempts to advance the research agenda of its member institutions. The Data Exchange Steering Committee is charged with setting the priorities and recommending annual work plans for research data specialists at member universities.

Membership
The U15 Group of Canadian Research Universities currently has 15 members, of which six are from Ontario, three from Quebec, two from Alberta, and one from British Columbia, Manitoba, Nova Scotia and Saskatchewan. Seven of the thirteen provinces and territories of Canada are represented in the group. Three of the six Ontario-based U15 universities are located within the Greater Golden Horseshoe, while two of the three Quebec-based universities are located within Montreal.

Collectively, the members of U15 represent 47 percent of all university students in Canada, 71 percent of all full-time doctoral students in the country, 87 percent of all contracted private-sector research in Canada, and 80 percent of all patents and start-ups in Canada. As a group, the U15 universities attract C$5.3 billion in annual research income, notably holding 80 percent of all competitively allocated research funding in Canada.

See also
 Canadian university scientific research organizations
Maple League of Universities
 Higher education in Canada
 List of universities in Canada
 List of higher education associations and alliances
 List of higher education associations and organizations in Canada
 ORION (research and education network)
 Rankings of universities in Canada

Notes

References

External links
 

 
1991 establishments in Ontario
College and university associations and consortia in Canada